The 2016 Shanghai Rolex Masters was a tennis tournament played on outdoor hard courts. It was the eighth edition of the Shanghai ATP Masters 1000, classified as an ATP World Tour Masters 1000 event on the 2016 ATP World Tour. It took place at Qizhong Forest Sports City Arena in Shanghai, China from October 9 to October 16, 2016.

Points and prize money

Point distribution

Prize money

Singles main-draw entrants

Seeds

 1 Rankings are as of October 3, 2016

Other entrants
The following players received wildcards into the singles main draw:
 Juan Martín del Potro
 Li Zhe
 Wu Di
 Zhang Ze

The following player using a protected ranking into the singles main draw:
 Florian Mayer
 Janko Tipsarević

The following players received entry from the qualifying draw:
 Kyle Edmund
 Taylor Fritz
 Vasek Pospisil
 Lukáš Rosol
 Yūichi Sugita
 Mikhail Youzhny
 Mischa Zverev

Withdrawals
Before the tournament
 Borna Ćorić →replaced by  Federico Delbonis
 Roger Federer →replaced by  Marcel Granollers
 Nicolas Mahut →replaced by  Fernando Verdasco
 Gilles Müller →replaced by  Nicolás Almagro
 Kei Nishikori →replaced by  Guillermo García López 
 Dominic Thiem →replaced by  Guido Pella

Doubles main-draw entrants

Seeds

 Rankings are as of October 3, 2016

Other entrants
The following pairs received wildcards into the doubles main draw:
 Gong Maoxin /  Zhang Ze
 Li Zhe /  Wu Di

Champions

Singles

 Andy Murray def.  Roberto Bautista Agut 7–6(7–1), 6–1

Doubles

 John Isner /  Jack Sock def.  Henri Kontinen /  John Peers 6–4, 6–4

Controversies
Nick Kyrgios was fined nearly US$17,000 for 'lack of best efforts' in his second round match against Mischa Zverev. Kyrgios threw the match 6–3 6–1, at one point asking the umpire, "Can you call time so I can finish this match and go home?" When later asked during a press conference if he thought he owed the fans a better effort, he responded: "What does that even mean? I'm good at hitting a tennis ball at the net. Big deal. I don't owe them anything. If you don't like it, I didn't ask you to come watch. Just leave."

References

External links
Official Website